The A. J. Mason Building is a single-story brick building that is the only remaining original structure in Tullahassee, Oklahoma. The building was listed on the National Register of Historic Places August 5, 1985.

The building reportedly housed a grocery store until sometime in the 1950s. It later housed a nightclub.

References

Commercial buildings on the National Register of Historic Places in Oklahoma
Buildings and structures in Wagoner County, Oklahoma
National Register of Historic Places in Wagoner County, Oklahoma